Eupithecia emanata is a moth in the family Geometridae. It is found in the Russian Far East, on the Kuriles and in Japan.

The wingspan is about 15–21 mm.

References

Moths described in 1908
emanata
Moths of Asia